Bariarpur (Hindi: बरियारपुर) is a village in Munger district in Bihar state of India.

Demographics 
The 2011 Census of India registered the population of Bariarpur as 16614, of which 8977 were male and 7637 female. The average literacy rate was 77.5%.

Transportation 
The northern terminus of National Highway 333 is located here, where it branches off from National Highway 33. Bariarpur railway station is situated on Sahibganj Loop line under the Malda railway division.

References 

Villages in Munger district